Lluís Pujol Codina (born 25 May 1947) is a Spanish former football forward and manager.

Club career
Born in Castellbell i el Vilar, Barcelona, Catalonia, Pujol was promoted to local FC Barcelona's first team in 1965. In his first three seasons, however, he could only total ten La Liga appearances, in which he managed to score five times. For 1968–69 he was loaned to neighbours CE Sabadell FC, helping the side not only avoid top-flight relegation but finish in a best-ever fourth place, with the player contributing eight goals to the feat.

Returned to the Camp Nou, Pujol continued to be irregularly used – 25 games in 1970–71, 28 over the other three seasons – and eventually left for CD Castellón, in a disastrous top-division campaign as he appeared rarely for the Valencian club which also got relegated. He closed out his career at the age of 28, after one year with lowly UE Sant Andreu in his native region.

Pujol coached FC Barcelona Atlètic in the late 80s, suffering relegation from the Segunda División in his second year. He then moved to former team Sabadell, being dismissed in November 1990 with them in the same level.

International career
On 15 October 1969, Pujol won his sole cap for Spain, which consisted of the second half of a 1970 FIFA World Cup qualifier against Finland, in a match played in La Línea de la Concepción and with the score already at 5–0 (eventually 6–0).

Honours

Club
Barcelona
Copa del Generalísimo: 1970–71
Inter-Cities Fairs Cup: 1965–66, 1971

International
Spain U18
UEFA European Under-18 Championship runner-up: 1964

References

External links

FC Barcelona profile

1947 births
Living people
People from Bages
Sportspeople from the Province of Barcelona
Spanish footballers
Footballers from Catalonia
Association football forwards
La Liga players
Segunda División players
CE Manresa players
CD Condal players
FC Barcelona players
CE Sabadell FC footballers
CD Castellón footballers
UE Sant Andreu footballers
Spain youth international footballers
Spain under-23 international footballers
Spain amateur international footballers
Spain international footballers
Spanish football managers
Segunda División managers
Segunda División B managers
Tercera División managers
FC Barcelona Atlètic managers
CE Sabadell FC managers
CE L'Hospitalet managers